John Wynn may refer to:

John "Wynn" ap Maredudd, Head of the cadet lineage of the House of Aberffraw descending from Rhodri ab Owain Gwynedd, 1525–1559
Sir John Wynn, 1st Baronet (1553–1627), his descendant, Welsh baronet, Member of Parliament for Carnarvonshire, 1586
Sir John Wynn, 5th Baronet (1628–1719)
Sir John Wynn, 2nd Baronet (1701–1773)

See also
John Wynne (disambiguation)
John Wynn Baker (died 1775), Irish economist